Rachel Barenblat, the "Velveteen Rabbi," is an American poet, rabbi, chaplain and blogger who was ordained as a rabbi in 2011 and as a spiritual director in 2012. In 2013 she was named a Rabbis Without Borders fellow by Clal, the Center for Learning and Leadership, and in 2015 was named co-chair of ALEPH: Alliance for Jewish Renewal along with Rabbi David Markus. In 2016, The Forward named her one of America's most inspiring rabbis.

Background 
Born in San Antonio, Texas in 1975 to Marvin and Liana Barenblat, Rachel moved to New England in 1992 to attend Williams College in Williamstown, Massachusetts. She holds a BA in religion from Williams and a Masters of Fine Arts in writing and literature from the Bennington Writing Seminars, as well as rabbinic ordination from ALEPH: the Alliance for Jewish Renewal and a secondary ordination as a mashpi'ah, also from ALEPH.

Work 
In 2000 Barenblat co-founded Inkberry, a literary arts non-profit organization, with Sandy Ryan and Emily Banner. From 1999-2002 she was a contributing editor at Pif Magazine and for several years in the early 2000s served as contributing editor at Zeek magazine, a Jewish journal of thought and culture. Her book Massachusetts: The Bay State was published in 2002 by World Almanac Library, along with books about Wisconsin, Michigan, Washington and Texas. From 2009-2011, she served on the board of directors of the Organization for Transformative Works. Beginning in 2014 she served on the board of directors of ALEPH: Alliance for Jewish Renewal, which she co-chaired from 2015-2017. In 2018 she co-founded Bayit: Building Jewish.

Barenblat is author of several book-length collections of poetry, including 70 faces: Torah poems (Phoenicia Publishing, 2011), Waiting to Unfold (Phoenicia, 2013), and Texts to the Holy (Ben Yehuda Press, 2018), as well as a variety of liturgical works, most notably her haggadah for Pesach and a volume for mourners called Beside Still Waters co-published by Ben Yehuda Press and Bayit: Building Jewish in 2019.

Her first full-length collection of poems, 70 Faces—a collection of poems which arise out of a full year's cycle of weekly Torah portions—was published by Montreal-based Phoenicia Publishing in 2011.

70 faces received critical praise:

"These poems are so out there, so radical, and at the same time so gentle and inviting. Barenblat manages to do work that has passion and truth behind it, without ranting. I love the simple and confident way she deals with the akedah -- and I love the final poem in this collection -- gliding right past heartbreak into renewal, which is what her poems all seem to do." -- Alicia Ostriker

 "Rachel Barenblat's Torah poems open the doorway into sacred text so that we can walk in and make it our home. She invites us to bring all of our passion, doubt, humor, humility and chutzpah as we encounter these ancient words and bring them to Life. Through Rachel's skillful, joyful, playful and profound poetry, the Torah opens her secrets to us and invites us into an intimate conversation with Truth." -- Rabbi Shefa Gold

and has received generally positive reviews:

"[The poems in 70 Faces] take time to think about daily things -- a bottle of milk, talismans on a desk -- and ongoing things -- the names of animals, the urge to make -- and lifelong things -- a baby born in danger, a difficult reunion at a funeral. // They chronicle the round of the year and the quiet, continual effort to walk forward, to think about work and family and the light on the ridge lines."

"Reb Rachel engages head-on with a question that nags — what is the downside to this whole taking over Canaan business? There is nothing heavy-handed or polemical here. She could be talking about the ancient Israelites, the modern Israelites, or any of us caught in the situation of getting the better of someone else. In my humble, really good poetry tackles big questions in such a way as to leave the reader with more questions, shaking our collective heads heads in wonder. The good stuff – and here I'm quoting another poem from the book - builds a structure to house what you long for."

although the Forward reviewer argued that the book's fatal flaw is "its failure to live up to the claims the author makes for it."

Her second book of poetry, Waiting to Unfold, was also published by Phoenicia (2013):

Poet and rabbi Rachel Barenblat wrote one poem during each week of her son's first year of life, chronicling the wonder and the delight along with the pain of learning to nurse, the exhaustion of sleep deprivation, and the dark descent into -- and eventual ascent out of -- postpartum depression.

This book is two cycles, one of pregnancy, and one of the first year after her child's birth. The poems have that same "Oh! I'd forgotten about how beautiful/hard/sad/quiet/fierce that was" quality that all true stories about the first year of parenthood do, and made me laugh and tear up a little and feel nostalgic and sad for new mothers everywhere.

Barenblat is also author of several poetry chapbooks, among them the skies here (Pecan Grove Press, 1995), What Stays (Bennington Writing Seminars Alumni Chapbook Series, 2002), chaplainbook (Laupe House Press, 2006), and the self-published Through, a collection of miscarriage poems (2009.)

From 2005 to 2010, Barenblat was a student in the ALEPH rabbinic program; she was ordained a rabbi in early 2011. She started a blog, Velveteen Rabbi, in 2003, and in the spring of 2008, it was named one of the top 25 blogs in Time.com's First Annual Blog Index. She has guest-blogged at Jewess, Kesher Talk, Sojourner, and the Best American Poetry Blog, and she spent a year writing weekly Torah commentaries for Radical Torah. Her poetry appears in The Heart of All That Is: Reflections on Home (Holy Cow! Press, 2013), Before There Is Nowhere to Stand (Lost Horse Press, 2012), and The Bloomsbury Anthology of Contemporary Jewish American Poetry (Bloomsbury, 2013), among others.

With Thurman Hart, Barenblat co-founded the first Progressive Faith Blog Con, a gathering for bloggers of progressive faith which took place in Montclair, New Jersey in 2006.

Her Velveteen Rabbi's Haggadah for Pesach, a free and open-source haggadah which combines traditional texts with poetry and creative interpretations, is used worldwide.

Personal life 
Barenblat lives in Williamstown, Massachusetts. She married Ethan Zuckerman in 1998, and they have one son. They divorced in 2016. Since  2011 she has served as the rabbi for Congregation Beth Israel in North Adams, MA. She has also served as interim Jewish chaplain to Williams College.

References

External links 

Velveteen Rabbi
FP Interviews Rachel Barenblat
America's Most Inspiring Rabbis 2016
“Judaism Shines Through Everything They Do: Ginsburg, Sandberg, Barenblat” by Haley Codron. Orlando Sentinel, May 9, 2017.
Rachel Barenblat, “Is Ranting Against Globalism Anti Semitic?” Forward, October 24, 2018.

Writers from San Antonio
1975 births
Williams College alumni
Poets from Texas
American women bloggers
American bloggers
Living people
Jewish bloggers
Jewish American writers
People from Berkshire County, Massachusetts
Women rabbis
American women poets
21st-century American poets
21st-century American women writers
American Jewish Renewal rabbis
21st-century American Jews
Mashpi'im